The Coco Plum Woman's Club is a historic women's club located at 1375 Sunset Drive in Coral Gables, Florida. The club was founded in 1912 with eight members; it was named for the local cocoplum fruit. While the club was originally based in one of its members' houses, it built its own clubhouse in 1913. Its historic Mediterranean Revival clubhouse was built in 1926. The club participated in homefront efforts during both World Wars; its work with the American Red Cross during World War II was well-regarded within Florida. During peacetime, the club has served as a community library, a social venue for meetings and dances, a clinic, and a pre-school.

The clubhouse was added to the National Register of Historic Places on June 17, 2005. It is part of the Clubhouses of Florida's Woman's Clubs Multiple Property Submission. The building is currently used as an event hall as well as a clubhouse.

References

External links
GFWC Coco Plum Woman's Club
The Coco Plum

Clubhouses on the National Register of Historic Places in Florida
Mediterranean Revival architecture in Florida
Buildings and structures completed in 1926
Buildings and structures in Coral Gables, Florida
Women's clubs in Florida
National Register of Historic Places in Miami-Dade County, Florida
1926 establishments in Florida